The 2013 Torneio Internacional de Brasília de Futebol Feminino (also known as the 2013 International Tournament of Brasilia) was the fifth edition of the Torneio Internacional de Futebol Feminino, an invitational women's football tournament held every December in Brazil. It began on 12 December and ended on 22 December 2013. The tournament had previously been held in São Paulo but was moved to Brasília in 2013 at the instigation of the Brazilian Football Confederation (CBF).

Format
In the first phase, the four teams play each other within the group in a single round. The two teams with the most points earned in the respective group, qualify for the next phase.

In the final stage, the first and second teams placed in the Group contest the final. Should the match ends in a tie, the team with the best record in the first phase is declared the winner.

The third and fourth teams placed in the group contest the third place play-off. Should the match ends in a tie, the team with the best record in the first phase is declared the winner.

Venues
All matches took place at Estádio Nacional Mané Garrincha in Brasília.

Teams
Listed are the confirmed teams.

Group stage
All times are local (UTC−02:00)

Knockout stage

Third place match

Final

Final results

Goalscorers

3 goals

 Debinha
 Marta

1 goal

 Cristiane
 Darlene
 Formiga
 Thaisa
 Adriana Leon
 Sophie Schmidt
 Christine Sinclair
 Yanara Aedo
 Fernanda Araya
 Francisca Lara
 Maria Jose Rojas
 Camila Sáez
 Sarah Crilly
 Hayley Lauder
 Christie Murray
 Jane Ross

References

External links
Official Site (in Portuguese)

2012
2013 in women's association football
2013 in Brazilian women's football
2013–14 in Chilean football
2013 in Canadian women's soccer
2013 in Scottish women's football